Adendorf (Northern Low Saxon: Adendörp) is a municipality in the district of Lüneburg, in Lower Saxony, Germany.

Twin towns
Adendorf is twinned with:

  Saint-Romain-de-Colbosc, France, since 1987
  Wągrowiec, Poland, since 2001

References